Erigeron kuschei is a rare species of flowering plant in the family Asteraceae known by the common name Chiricahua fleabane. It is endemic to Arizona in the southwestern United States, where it is known from two locations in the Chiricahua Mountains.

Erigeron kuschei is a rhizomatous perennial herb produces hairy stems a few centimeters tall.

This plant grows in shady spots on north-facing cliffs and outcrops, often in mossy spots among conifers.

The species is named for botanist J. August Kusche.

References

External links
United States Department of Agriculture Plants Profile

kuschei
Flora of Arizona
Plants described in 1931